Edward C. Sandoval (January 28, 1947 – March 3, 2021) was an American politician and a Democratic former member of the New Mexico House of Representatives representing District 17 from January 1983 through January 2015. He did not seek reelection in 2014.

Biography
Sandoval attended the University of New Mexico.

He died on March 3, 2021, at age 74.

Elections
 2012 Sandoval was unopposed for the June 5, 2012 Democratic Primary, winning with 2,221 votes and won the November 6, 2012 General election with 7,816 votes (66.6%) against Republican nominee Robert Cain.
 1982 Sandoval was first elected to the New Mexico Legislature in the November 2, 1982 General election and was re-elected in the general elections of November 6, 1984, November 4, 1986, and November 8, 1988.
 1990 Sandoval was unopposed for both the June 5, 1990 Democratic Primary, winning with 1,814 votes and the November 6, 1990 General election, winning with 3,677 votes.
 1992 Sandoval was challenged in the June 2, 1992 Democratic Primary, winning with 1,483 votes (56.1%) and won the November 3, 1992 General election with 4,650 votes (66.7%) against Republican nominee Bernardo Gallegos.
 1994 Sandoval was unopposed for both the June 7, 1994 Democratic Primary, winning with 2,138 votes and the November 8, 1994 General election, winning with 4,288 votes.
 1996 Sandoval was unopposed for both the June 4, 1996 Democratic Primary, winning with 1,853 votes and the November 5, 1996 General election.
 1998 Sandoval was unopposed for both the June 2, 1998 Democratic Primary, winning with 1,610 votes and the November 3, 1998 General election, winning with 4,404 votes.
 2000 Sandoval was unopposed for the 2000 Democratic Primary, winning with 1,570 votes and won the November 7, 2000 General election with 4,721 votes (69.1%) against Republican nominee Glenn Garcia.
 2002 Sandoval was unopposed for both the 2002 Democratic Primary, winning with 2,498 votes and the November 5, 2002 General election, winning with 6,237 votes.
 2004 Sandoval was unopposed for both the June 1, 2004 Democratic Primary, winning with 1,959 votes and the November 2, 2004 General election, winning with 9,714 votes.
 2006 Sandoval was unopposed for both the June 6, 2006 Democratic Primary, winning with 1,986 votes and the November 7, 2006 General election, winning with 7,965 votes.
 2008 Sandoval was unopposed for the June 8, 2008 Democratic Primary, winning with 2,923 votes and won the November 4, 2008 General election with 9,637 votes (66.6%) against Republican nominee Ronald Toya.
 2010 Sandoval was unopposed for both the June 1, 2010 Democratic Primary, winning with 2,251 votes and the November 2, 2010 General election, winning with 7,459 votes.

References

External links
 Official page at the New Mexico Legislature
 
 Edward Sandoval at Ballotpedia
 Edward C. Sandoval at OpenSecrets

1947 births
2021 deaths
Hispanic and Latino American state legislators in New Mexico
Democratic Party members of the New Mexico House of Representatives
Politicians from Albuquerque, New Mexico
University of New Mexico alumni